The 1872 FA Cup final was a football match between Wanderers and Royal Engineers on 16 March 1872 at Kennington Oval in London. It was the final of the first staging of the Football Association Challenge Cup (known in the modern era as the FA Cup), which became the primary cup competition in English football and the oldest football competition in the world. Fifteen teams entered the competition in its first season and, due to the rules in place at the time, Wanderers reached the final having won only one match in the four preceding rounds. In the semi-finals, they drew with the Scottish club Queen's Park, but reached the final when the Scots withdrew from the competition as they could not afford to return to London for a replay.

The final was decided by a single goal, scored after fifteen minutes by Morton Betts of Wanderers, who was playing under the pseudonym "A.H. Chequer". The Engineers were praised for their innovative use of passing, then referred to as the "Combination Game", at a time when most teams relied almost solely on dribbling tactics. Despite this they could not manage to score a goal. The winning Wanderers team did not receive the trophy until the following month, when it was presented to them at a special reception at the Pall Mall Restaurant.

Route to the final 

Wanderers and Royal Engineers were among fifteen teams who entered the inaugural FA Cup competition, and both were allocated home matches in the first round. Wanderers were paired with Harrow Chequers, a team consisting of former pupils of Harrow School, and the Engineers were set to face Reigate Priory. Neither match actually took place, however, as in both cases the away team withdrew from the competition, sending the home team through to the next round on a walkover. In the second round, both teams played away matches and emerged victorious. Wanderers defeated Clapham Rovers 1–0 in December and the Engineers beat Hitchin 5–0 the following month.

At the quarter-final stage, Wanderers drew 0–0 with Crystal Palace (not the current professional club of the same name). Rather than be made to replay the match, however, both teams were permitted to go through to the semi-finals under one of the competition's original rules, which stated that in the event of a drawn match the teams would either be made to play again or both progress to the next round, at the organising committee's discretion. The Engineers beat Hampstead Heathens 2–0. In the semi-finals Wanderers took on the leading Scottish club Queen's Park who, due to a combination of walkovers and byes, had reached this stage of the competition without actually playing a match. The rules of the competition stated that all matches from the semi-final stage onwards would take place at Kennington Oval in London and, after being held to a 0–0 draw, the Scottish club could not afford to make the lengthy trip from Glasgow a second time for a replay and withdrew from the competition, sending Wanderers into the final. The Engineers also drew their semi-final at the Oval 0–0, and beat Crystal Palace 3–0 in the replay.

Match

Summary 

As was common at the time, both teams focused mainly on attack rather than defence, the Engineers lining up with seven forwards and Wanderers with eight. Wanderers forward Morton Betts played under the pseudonym "A. H. Chequer", derived from his membership of the Harrow Chequers club. Some sources state that he played under an assumed name to disguise the fact that he was cup-tied, having been a registered player of the Chequers club at the start of the competition and therefore ineligible to play for another club in that season's cup. This, however, is unlikely to be true, as in the early amateur era of football players were not required to be formally registered with clubs. Cuthbert Ottaway, a future captain of the England national team, played for two different clubs in consecutive rounds of the 1871–72 FA Cup without incident.

Wanderers captain C. W. Alcock won the coin toss and chose to defend the Harleyford Road end of the ground, meaning that the Engineers, who were considered the favourites at the start of play, initially had the sun and wind in their faces. Early in the game, Edmund Creswell of the Royal Engineers suffered a broken collar bone in a melee. He refused to leave the pitch but due to his injury was forced to spend the remainder of the match as a "passenger" on the wing. Wanderers' tactics centred on the dribbling skills of individual players, while the Engineers favoured passing the ball, a style then known as the "Combination Game" and considered innovative, of which they were leading exponents.

Wanderers took the lead fifteen minutes into the game when Betts opened the scoring from an acute angle after Walpole Vidal's long dribble. Under the rules in use at the time, the teams changed ends after each goal, but the Engineers were unable to take advantage of the fact that the sun and wind were now behind them, and the Wanderers players remained dominant. After twenty minutes Alcock put the ball past the Engineers' goalkeeper, William Merriman, but the goal was disallowed because Charles Wollaston had handled the ball. Wanderers continued to exert further pressure on the Engineers' goal and only Merriman's skill was able to prevent them from increasing their lead. One newspaper later described his performance as "perfect". Despite a late rally from the Engineers, Wanderers were able to hold on to their lead and the game ended in a 1–0 victory. Newspaper The Field called the final "the fastest and hardest match that has ever been seen at The Oval" and said that the Wanderers displayed "some of the best play, individually and collectively, that has ever been shown in an Association game".

Details 

Match rules:90 minutes normal time.30 minutes extra-time if scores are level, at captains' discretion.Replay if scores still level.No substitutes.

Post-match 
The Cup was presented by the President of the Football Association, Ebenezer Morley, at the annual dinner of the Wanderers at the Pall Mall Restaurant, Charing Cross, on 11 April. The Football Association also gave each player in the winning team a silk badge commemorating the victory and the Wanderers' committee presented each player with an inscribed gold medal. As cup-holders, Wanderers received a bye straight to the final of the following year's FA Cup, in keeping with the original concept of the competition being a "challenge cup". This was the only time this rule was used.

In 1938, The Times published an obituary for Thomas Hooman and stated that he had scored the winning goal in the 1872 cup final, citing an interview the player gave shortly before his death. This claim is not backed up by contemporary newspaper reports, all of which list Betts as the goalscorer, and, as other quoted aspects of Hooman's reminiscences about the match were incorrect, it seems that in his old age he was confusing the 1872 final with another match in which he played.

In 2010, the only known surviving medal from the final was offered for sale at an auction in London. It had been purchased by a jeweller as part of a house clearance in the 1950s and was expected to sell for up to £50,000, but was ultimately purchased by the Professional Footballers' Association for £70,500. On 7 November 2012, the match was replayed by the reformed Wanderers side and the Royal Engineers team at the original venue, The Oval.

References 
General
 

Specific

External links 
 BBC Sport article on the match

1872
FA
1872 sports events in London
March 1872 sports events